The 7th constituency of Val-de-Marne is a French legislative constituency in the Val-de-Marne département.

Description

The 7th constituency of Val-de-Marne was moved entirely as a result of the 2010 redistricting of French legislative constituencies and now covers the same territory as the old 12th Constituency of Val-de-Marne. The seat occupies the south west corner of the department.

Because of these boundary changes historical comparisons can not be made with the old 7th Constituency. The old 12th Constituency of Val-de-Marne elected a UMP deputy at the  2002 and the 2007 elections.

Historic Representation

Election results

2022

 
 
 
 
 
 
 
 
|-
| colspan="8" bgcolor="#E9E9E9"|
|-

2017

 
 
 
 
 
 
|-
| colspan="8" bgcolor="#E9E9E9"|
|-

2012

 
 
 
 
 
 
 
|-
| colspan="8" bgcolor="#E9E9E9"|
|-

2007

 
 
 
 
 
 
 
|-
| colspan="8" bgcolor="#E9E9E9"|
|-

2002

 
 
 
 
 
 
 
 
|-
| colspan="8" bgcolor="#E9E9E9"|
|-

1997

 
 
 
 
 
 
 
 
 
 
|-
| colspan="8" bgcolor="#E9E9E9"|
|-

Sources
Official results of French elections from 2002: "Résultats électoraux officiels en France" (in French).

7